John VII, surnamed Grammatikos or Grammaticus, i.e., "the Grammarian" (Greek: Ιωάννης Ζ΄ Γραμματικός, Iōannīs VII Grammatikos), (? – before 867) was Ecumenical Patriarch of Constantinople from January 21, 837 to March 4, 843, died before 867. He is not to be confused with the much earlier philosopher John Philoponos.

Life
John was born to an aristocratic family of Armenian origin. His father was Pankratios Morocharzanios and he had a brother, Arsaber. Warren Treadgold identifies the latter with the Arsaber who married a sister of Empress Theodora, wife of Emperor Theophilos. John's sister was the mother of the later Patriarch Photios. 

Beginning his clerical career in c. 811, John was also a painter of icons and a correspondent of Theodore of Stoudios. By 814, John had become an Iconoclast and Emperor Leo V chose him to lead a committee to collect patristic texts supporting this theological position in preparation for the synod of 815, which reinstituted Iconoclasm. John was rewarded for his troubles by being appointed abbot of the prestigious Sergios and Bakchos Monastery (now the Little Hagia Sophia), where recalcitrant Iconodules were being reeducated.

John was renowned for his learning (hence the nickname Grammatikos), and for his persuasive rhetoric in the endless debates that are a favorite subject of hagiographic sources reflecting the second period of Iconoclasm. John was also charged with tutoring the future Emperor Theophilos during the reign of his father Michael II, and is credited with instilling strong Iconoclast sympathies in his student. On the accession of Theophilos, John was appointed synkellos (patriarch's assistant), a position that made him a likely heir to the patriarchate. In c. 830, John was dispatched on an embassy to the Abbasid Caliph al-Ma'mun, but this did little to prevent a period of fierce warfare between the Byzantine Empire and the Abbasids. He did, however, bring back a plan of the Abbasid palace at Baghdad for the amusement of his emperor and supervised the building of a similar structure in Bithynia.

The circumstances of John VII's patriarchate are obscure. He was appointed patriarch, in 837, by his student Theophilos and may have been responsible for the slight intensification of the persecution of Iconodules. He was deposed by Theophilos' widow Theodora, his own relative, as a preliminary towards the ending of Iconoclasm in 843. The deposed patriarch survived into the 860s.

Citations

References
 The Oxford Dictionary of Byzantium, Oxford University Press, 1991.
 J.B. Bury, A History of the Eastern Roman Empire from the Fall of Irene to the Accession of Basil I (A.D. 802–867), London, 1912.
 Smith, Jason Domonick "John Grammatikos: An Oblique History of a Damned Patriarch", Thesis, California State University, Sacramento, 2010. http://csus-dspace.calstate.edu/handle/10211.9/503

860s deaths
9th-century patriarchs of Constantinople
Byzantine people of Armenian descent
Year of birth unknown
Ambassadors of the Byzantine Empire to the Abbasid Caliphate
Byzantine Iconoclasm